Prince Karl Johann of Liechtenstein (Karl Borromäus Johann Nepomuk Anton; 14 June 1803, in Vienna – 12 October 1871, in Ischl) was the third son of Johann I Joseph, Prince of Liechtenstein (1760–1836) and wife Landgravine Josepha of Fürstenberg-Weitra, nephew of Aloys I, brother of Aloys II and uncle of Johann II and Franz I.

Marriage and issue
On 10 September 1832, in Graz, he married Rosalie d'Hemricourt Gräfin von Grünne (3 March 1805, in Vienna – 20 April 1841, in Freiwaldau), widow of Ludwig Johann Heinrich, Graf von Schönfeldt (20 March 1791, in Vienna – 19 August 1828, in Reitenau), and had three children:
 Prince Rudolf (28 December 1833, in Graz – 23 May 1888, in Burg Pienzenau, Weyarn), married firstly in Vienna on 28 May 1859 and divorced in 1877 Klara Gräfin Sermage de Szomszédvár (19 September 1836, in Vienna – 8 April 1909, in Munich), and had issue, an only daughter, and married secondly in Klausenburg (Cluj-Napoca), on 8 October 1877 Marie Therese Hedwig Perzel (Stein?) (c. 1846 in Liegnitz – 17 May 1921, in Wiesbaden), without issue:
 Princess Klara Maria Carolina Rudolfina (27 January 1861, in Vienna – 8 November 1861, in Vienna)
 Prince Philipp Karl Alexander (17 July 1837, in Graz – 15 March 1901, in Vienna), married firstly on 12 May 1862 Marianna Contessa Marcolini-Ferretti (c. 1845 – 7 June 1864, in Klenovnik, near Varaždin, Croatia), and had issue, two sons, and married secondly in Budapest on 25 March 1879 Franziska Chalupatzky, by adoption Todesco (21 August 1843, in Vienna – 1 October 1921, in Bad Ischl), without issue:
 Prince Karl Joseph Camillo Philipp Maria (27 September 1862, in Klenovnik – 24 February 1893, in Neulengbach), unmarried and without issue
 Prince Joseph Philipp (22 August 1863, in Klenovnik – 22 August 1863, in Klenovnik)
 Princess Albertine Josepha Antonia (29 June 1838, in Graz – 25 April 1844, in Vienna)

Ancestry

References

1803 births
1871 deaths
Princes of Liechtenstein
Sons of monarchs